Living the Questions (LtQ) is a “DVD and web-based curriculum" designed to help people evaluate the relevance of Christianity in the 21st century. Living the Questions was co-created by the Arizonan United Methodist ministers Jeff Procter-Murphy and David Felten as part of the larger movement of Progressive Christianity. It is distributed through the Internet and through several denominational publishing divisions, like Cokesbury and Logos Productions. Living the Questions offers an alternative to the Alpha Course.  the LtQ curriculum is in use in nearly 5000 churches across North America, the United Kingdom, Australia, and New Zealand.

Curriculum 
Living the Questions does not offer a “systematic theology”, but is rather a thematic overview developed from questions raised in local parishes. It utilizes both written material and DVD-based input. LtQ curricula seek to expose lay people to the complex theological questions and perspectives that are taught in seminaries, but that often don't “trickle down” into the local churches. The programs do not aim to spell out new doctrine or to develop new dogma, but to resource people who are in the midst of a lifelong conversation about the mysteries of faith and life.

Reception 
Reviewers have called Living the Questions both “enlightening and inspiring”  and “fascinating” in that the series raises questions many have “thought about but have been afraid to ask, and topics they know are important but don't hear mentioned in church”. 

In her book, Christianity for the Rest of Us, Diana Butler Bass notes that both the Living the Questions program and its methodology were part of the success and vitality of one of her subject churches, Trinity Episcopal Church in Santa Barbara, California. In Big Christianity: What's Right with the Religious Left, author Jan G. Linn wrote: “Living the Questions is a welcomed … alternative to literalism that has promise in helping Christians find the biblical grounding for Bigger Christianity". 

The US liberal flagship mainline church magazine The Christian Century criticized the original 12-session version of Living the Questions for taking a fundamentalist-like position, “close to a mirror image” of “fundamentalists”.  The principal course has since been expanded to nearly twice the original length, doubling the number of contributing participants and broadening the mix of contributors to include more women, more racial minorities, and more representation from the LGBT community.

Book 
Based on the Living the Questions curriculum and written by the series creators, the book Living the Questions: The Wisdom of Progressive Christianity was released by HarperOne (an imprint of HarperCollins) in August 2012.

Contributors 
All of the following contributors appear in "Living the Questions 2.0"; some appear in other curricula in the Living the Questions catalog:

 Nancy Ammerman
 John L. Bell
 Marcus Borg
 Rita Nakashima Brock
 Walter Brueggemann
 Ron Buford
 Minerva G. Carcaño
 John B. Cobb
 John Dominic Crossan
 David Felten
 Yvette Flunder
 James A. Forbes
 Matthew Fox
 Lloyd Geering
 Hans Küng
 Cynthia Langston Kirk
 Amy-Jill Levine
 Megan McKenna
 Pat McMahon
 Culver "Bill" Nelson
 Siyoung Park
 Rebecca Ann Parker
 Stephen Patterson
 Helen Prejean
 Jeff Procter-Murphy
 Barbara Rossing
 Tex Sample
 Elisabeth Schüssler Fiorenza
 Bernard Brandon Scott
 John Shelby Spong
 Emilie Townes
 Rick Ufford-Chase
 Winnie Varghese
 Mel White

The 2010 release of LtQ2's “Home Edition” added the insights of Brian McLaren, Robin Meyers, and Diana Butler Bass.

Curriculum 
Developed originally for use at Asbury United Methodist and Via de Cristo United Methodist in Arizona, what started out as just one DVD series is now a growing catalogue of curriculum.

 Living the Questions 2.0: An Introduction to Progressive Christianity
 Saving Jesus Redux
 Eclipsing Empire: Paul, Rome and the Kingdom of God with John Dominic Crossan and Marcus Borg, on location in Turkey
 First Light: Jesus and the Kingdom of God with John Dominic Crossan and Marcus Borg, on location in the Galilee and Jerusalem
 Countering Pharaoh's Production/Consumption Society Today with Walter Brueggemann
 Questioning Capital Punishment with Sr. Helen Prejean
 Tex Mix: Stories of Earthy Mysticism with Tex Sample
 Jesus for the Non-Religious with John Shelby Spong
 Uppity Women of the Bible with Lisa Wolf
 Singing the Unsung with John L. Bell
 DreamThinkBeDo (a remix of LtQ's other work intended for young adults)

References

External links 
 

Protestant education
Christian media
Practical theology